{{DISPLAYTITLE:C18H23NO4}}
The molecular formula C18H23NO4 (molar mass: 317.37 g/mol, exact mass: 317.1627 u) may refer to:

 Arbutamine
 Cocaethylene
 Denopamine
 14-Hydroxydihydrocodeine